This is a list of films produced in Pakistan in 2006 (see 2006 in film) and in the Urdu language.

2006

See also
2006 in Pakistan

External links
 Search Pakistani film - IMDB.com

2006
Pakistani
Films